"You Came" is a song by English singer Kim Wilde from her sixth studio album, Close (1988). It was released on 4 July 1988 as the album's second single. The song was written by Wilde and Ricky Wilde, after the birth of his first child, Marty.

"You Came" became one of the most successful singles of Wilde's career, peaking at number three on the UK Singles Chart and reaching the top 10 in several other European countries, including Denmark, where it reached number one for five weeks. In the United States, it was her fourth (and, to date, final) single to reach the top 50, peaking at number 41 on the Billboard Hot 100. It also reached number 10 on the Billboard Hot Dance Club Play chart.

Remixes and B-sides
The version of the song used for the 7-inch single in Europe and Australia was an edited version of the original found on the Close album. An extended version was also released on the 12-inch and CD single format.

In North America, a remix by Shep Pettibone was included on both formats, with an edited version on the 7-inch and two different dub versions (only available on the 12-inch format). The full length Pettibone remix was also released on a separate 12-inch single in Europe.

In the countries where "You Came" was the first Close single (namely North America and France), the B-side used was an exclusive non-album track called "Tell Me Where You Are," which in the rest of the world had been the B-side to the first Close single "Hey Mister Heartache". In these countries the B-side to "You Came" was a track from the album entitled "Stone."

Track listings

 UK and Australian 7-inch single
A. "You Came"
B. "Stone"

 UK mini-CD and 12-inch single
 "You Came" – 6:44
 "You Came" (7-inch version) – 3:29
 "Stone" – 4:41

 UK 12-inch single – Shep Pettibone mix
A. "You Came" (Shep Pettibone mix)
B. "You Came"

 US and Canadian 7-inch single, US cassette single
A. "You Came" – 4:02
B. "Tell Me Where You Are" – 3:11

 US and Canadian 12-inch single
A. "You Came" (the Shep Pettibone mix) – 7:35
B1. "You Came" (dub version 1) – 4:52
B2. "You Came" (dub version 2) – 4:52

Charts

Weekly charts

Year-end charts

2006 version

In 2006, Wilde re-recorded "You Came", retitled "You Came (2006)", for her tenth studio album, Never Say Never. The re-working was released on 18 August 2006 as the album's lead single, reaching the top 30 in several European countries.

Track listings
CD single
"You Came (2006)"
"Maybe I'm Crazy"

CD maxi single
"You Came (2006)"
"Maybe I'm Crazy"
"You Came (2006)" (Groovenut remix)
"You Came (2006)" (Old School mix)

Charts

Cover versions
"You Came" has been covered several times and in several different languages. A Greek version entitled "Eisai oti agapo" (You are all that I love) was released by Bessy Argyraki, a Finnish version entitled "Niin tein" was released by the band Hausmylly, and the original English version has been covered by German band Aura, Estonian singer Hylene, the B. City Crew, Baz, and Candy Warhol.

References

1988 singles
1988 songs
2006 singles
Kim Wilde songs
MCA Records singles
Number-one singles in Denmark
Songs written by Kim Wilde
Songs written by Ricky Wilde